Chantry Park is a park located west of Ipswich town centre, in the Ipswich district, in the county of Suffolk, England. It is the largest park in Ipswich and extends over 124 acres. Chantry Park was opened to the public on 17 May 1928 and was designated a Conservation Area in 2005.

Chantry Park itself is Grade II listed park, and it contains three Grade II listed structures: The Chantry and the gate house and entrance gatepiers (which share a listing).

The Chantry

The Chantry is a large mansion built in the eighteenth century, and substantially altered in the nineteenth century. At one time the mansion was the home of Sir Fitzroy Edward Kelly, a prominent lawyer, politician and judge, who sat as Member of Parliament for the Ipswich constituency.

The Chantry now houses a Sue Ryder neurological care centre, caring for people aged 18 and over with a range of neurological conditions such as Huntington's disease, Parkinson's disease and multiple sclerosis.

Events
In 1934, Chantry Park hosted that year's Royal Agricultural Show, organised by the Royal Agricultural Society of England.

From 23 to 26 August 2019 around 160,000 people attended Ed Sheeran's ÷ Tour. After the shows, work to partly restore the park began on 2 September 2019.

References 

Parks and open spaces in Ipswich